The 1982 Colorado gubernatorial election was held on November 2, 1982. Incumbent Democrat Richard Lamm defeated Republican nominee John Fuhr with 65.69% of the vote.

Primary elections
Primary elections were held on September 14, 1982.

Democratic primary

Candidates
Richard Lamm, incumbent Governor

Results

Republican primary

Candidates
John Fuhr, former Speaker of the Colorado House of Representatives

Results

General election

Candidates
Major party candidates
Richard Lamm, Democratic
John Fuhr, Republican 

Other candidates
Paul K. Grant, Libertarian
Earl F. Dodge Jr., Prohibition
Alan Gummerson, Socialist Workers

Results

References

1982
Colorado